USS Chichota (SP-65) was an armed yacht that served in the United States Navy as a patrol vessel from 1917 to 1918.
 
Chichota was built as the private steam yacht Niagara III in 1901 by Herreshoff Manufacturing Company at Bristol, Rhode Island. She had been renamed Chichota by the time the U.S. Navy acquired her for World War I service as a patrol vessel under a free lease from her owner,  Edwin Gould of New York City, on 1 May 1917.  The Navy commissioned her on 5 June 1917 as USS Chichota (SP-65).

Chichota was assigned to the 3rd Naval District, where she performed submarine net patrol duty in the New York Harbor area. She was transferred for a brief time to the Chesapeake Bay area, but returned to New York early in 1918.

Chichota was decommissioned on 21 December 1918 and returned to her owner.

References

Department of the Navy Naval Historical Center Online Library of Selected Images: Civilian Ships: Chichota (American Steam Yacht, 1901). Previously named Niagara III. Served as USS Chichota (SP-65) in 1917–1918
NavSource Online: Section Patrol Craft Photo Archive Chichota (SP 65)

Patrol vessels of the United States Navy
World War I patrol vessels of the United States
Ships built in Bristol, Rhode Island
Steam yachts
1901 ships